The Directorate-General for Military Intelligence, known as "Military Intelligence" (MI), is the intelligence arm of the Pakistan Army. It is headquartered at the Army GHQ in Rawalpindi, Pakistan.

Unlike the Inter-Services Intelligence (ISI), the MI is composed entirely of uniformed army officials, supported by civilians, whose primary mission is to determine the military capability of, and any other information related to, the military forces of hostile countries. It is also tasked with gathering offensive counter-insurgency intelligence, identifying and eliminating sleeper cells, foreign agents and other anti-state elements within Pakistan, including investigation of military espionage.

Historical overview
The agency (MI) was created by Major General Robert Cawthom, who also served as its first Director. Cawthom later established the ISI Directorate in the 1950s. Prior to the successful imposition of the coup d'état against the government of President Major General (retired) Iskander Mirza, the MI's Director General Major General Syed Shahid Hamid reported to the then Commander-in-Chief Field Marshal Ayub Khan. The MI reported that Martial Law was promulgated in the entire country, both East-Pakistan and West-Pakistan.

In the 1980s, MI's activities included operations in Sindh against the Pakistan Communist Party (CPP) and Indian intelligence operatives.

The MI was also active during the Kargil war, where Major General Jamshed Gulzar Kiani led a series of intelligence-based operations against the enemy. However, the MI staged another coup d'état against the democratically elected government of Prime Minister Nawaz Sharif. The MI played a significant and integral role in bringing General Pervez Musharraf, Chief of Staff of the Pakistan Army and Chairman of the Joint Chiefs of Staff Committee, to political power.

Organization
The MI works in coordination with Air Intelligence (AI) of the Pakistan Air Force and Naval Intelligence (NI) of the (Pakistan Navy). It reports to the DG MI. All the appointed officers and enlisted personnel are from the Army. MI is one of the five main intelligence services in Pakistan. It is tasked with monitoring the military capabilities of its adversaries, counter-espionage operations, identifying and eliminating sleeper cells and foreign agents; the MI also keeps a close eye on the activities of officers within the Pakistan Army.The officers and soldiers of MI are mostly seen in civilian attire. The MI is headed by a serving Pakistan Army two-star general, Major General.

See also 
 The Establishment (Pakistan)

References 

Pakistani intelligence agencies
Pakistan
Military units and formations established in 1948
1948 establishments in Pakistan
Government agencies established in 1948
M